This is a list of poets who have written in the Nepali language:

A
 Abhi Subedi (born, 1945) – poet, essayist, critic, columnist and playwright
 Agam Singh Giri (1927–1971) – poet, lyricist
 Ali Miya (1919–2006) – folk poet
 Ashesh Malla (born, 1954) – poet, playwright and theater person

B

 Banira Giri (1946–2021) – poet
 Bhanubhakta Acharya (1814–1868) – poet and translator
 Bhim Nidhi Tiwari (1911–1973) – poet
 Bhola Rijal – poet, doctor
 Bhupal Rai – poet
 Bhupi Sherchan (1937–1990) – poet
Bhuwan Dhungana  – poet and storywriter
Bimala Tumkhewa – poet and journalist
Bijaya Malla – (1925 – 1999) poet, novelist and playwright
 Buddha Sayami (1944–2016) – poet

C

 Chakrapani Chalise (1883–1958) –  poet,writer of national anthem of Kingdom of Nepal.
 Chandani Shah (1949–2001) – poet, queen of Nepal
 Chittadhar Hridaya (1906–1982) – poet

D
 Dharanidhar Koirala – (1893–1980) – poet
 Dharmaraj Thapa
 Dharma Ratna Yami (1915–1975)
 Dharmendra Bikram Nembang (born 1976) – poet
 Dharmachari Guruma (1898–1978)
 Dhruba Chandra Gautam
 Dibya Khaling (1952–2006) – lyricist
 Dinesh Subba (born 1962)
 Durga Lal Shrestha (born 1935) – poet

G

 G. Shah, (born 1947)
 Gadul Singh Lama, (born 1939)
 Ganesh Lal Shrestha, (1911–1985) – poet
 Geeta Tripathee, (1972) – poet, lyricist and literary critic
 Girija Prasad Joshi, (1939–1987) – poet
 Gopal Prasad Rimal, (1918–1973) – poet
 Gopal Singh Nepali, (1911–1963)– poet
 Gyandil Das, (1821–1883)– poet

H
 Hangyug Agyat (born, 1978) – poet
Hari Bhakta Katuwal (1935–1980)
 Hari Prasad Gorkha Rai (1914–2005)

I
 Ishwor Ballav (1937–2008) – poet

J
 Jhamak Ghimire – autobiographer

K
 Kamala Sankrityayan (1920–2009)
 Kedar Man Vyathit – poet (1914–1998)
Komalnath Adhikari
 Krishna Bhooshan Bal (1948–2012) – poet
 Krishnahari Baral (born, 1954) – poet and critic
 Kshetra Pratap Adhikary (1943–2014) – poet
 Kul Bahadur KC (1946–2013) poet, laureate
 Kumar Nagarkoti, poet, writer

L

 Lakshmi Prasad Devkota (1909–1959) – poet, playwright and essayist
 Lekhnath Paudyal (1885–1966) – poet

M

 Madan Mohan Mishra (1931–2013) – poet
 Madhav Prasad Devkota
 Madhav Prasad Ghimire (1919–2020) – poet
 Mahananda Sapkota (1896–1977) – poet and linguist
 Mahendra of Nepal (1920–1972) – poet and King of Nepal
 Motiram Bhatta (1866–1896) – poet and ghazalist
 Mukunda Sharan Upadhyaya (born 1940) – poet

N
 Naba Raj Lamsal – (born 1969)
 Nara Nath Acharya (1906–1988)
 Neelam Karki Niharika – poet and writer
 Nanda Hangkhim (born  1944)
 Neer Shah (born 1951)

P

 Parijat (1937–1993) – poet and novelist
 Phatte Bahadur Singh (1902–1983) – poet
 Pawan Chamling  (born 1950) – poet
 Prema Shah – (1945–2017) poet, novelist and short–story writer

R
 Rajendra Bhandari (born 1956)
 Ramesh Kshitij (born 1969) – poet
 Ram Man Trishit (1941–2011)

S

 Santosh Lamichhane (born 1983) – poet
 Saraswati Pratikshya – poet, novelist
 Sarita Tiwari (born 1980) – poet, columnist
 Saru Bhakta – poet, novelist
 Shrawan Mukarung – poet
 Siddhicharan Shrestha (1912–1992) – poet
 Siddhidas Mahaju – poet
 Sulochana Manandhar (born 1955) – poet, columnist and activist
 Suman Pokhrel (born 1967) – poet, lyricist, translator and artist
 Swapnil Smriti (born 1981) – poet

T
 Tulsiram Sharma Kashyap
 Toya Gurung – poet
 Tulsi Ghimire – poet
 Tulsi Diwasa– poet, folklorist

U
 Usha Sherchan (born 1955) – poet, lyricist and story writer
 Upendra Subba (born 1971) – poet and story writer

V
 Vishnu Raj Atreya (born 1944) – poet and writer

Y
 Yogmaya Neupane (1867–1941) – poet 
 Yuddha Prasad Mishra (1964–2047 BS) – poet
 Yuyutsu Sharma (born 1960) – poet

Top of page

List
Nepali language
Nepali
poets